Lati or LATI may refer to:

Lati, Iran (disambiguation), places in Iran
Läti (disambiguation), Estonian places
Tirana International Airport Nënë Tereza, from its ICAO code
Lake Area Technical Institute, in South Dakota, US 
LATI (airline), a transatlantic airline operating between Italy and South America between 1939 and 1941

See also
Läti (disambiguation)